Mansour Hamaid (born 15 May 1967) is a Saudi Arabian archer. He competed in the 1984 Summer Olympics.

References

1967 births
Living people
Archers at the 1984 Summer Olympics
Saudi Arabian male archers
Olympic archers of Saudi Arabia